The VW Herald is a single day men's road cycling race held in South Africa.

Past winners

References
 Results

Cycle races in South Africa
Recurring sporting events established in 1988
Men's road bicycle races
1988 establishments in South Africa